Hunnan District, formerly Dongling District one of ten districts of the prefecture-level city of Shenyang, the capital of Liaoning Province, Northeast China, and forms part of the eastern and southeastern suburbs. The district contains 12 subdistricts of Shenyang proper, six towns, one rural township, and one ethnic rural township. It borders Shenbei New Area to the north, Sujiatun to the south, Heping to the west, and Shenhe and Dadong to the northwest; it also borders the prefecture-level city of Fushun to the east.

The former name Dongling refers to the Eastern Tomb, or Fuling Tomb, a UNESCO World Heritage Site, which is in fact two Qing dynasty tombs: of Nurhachi, the first emperor of Qing.

The district is rapidly becoming a developed, high-end residential area. There are two corridors along two major highways, one leading to the Eastern Tomb and Fushun, the other leading to the Shenyang Taoxian International Airport, along which one can see luxury apartments and sleek commercial development.

Administrative divisions
The district contains 12 subdistricts, six towns, one township, and one ethnic township.

Subdistricts:
Nanta Subdistrict, Quanyuan Subdistrict, Maguanqiao Subdistrict, Fengle Subdistrict, Huishan Subdistrict, Dongling Subdistrict, Yingda Subdistrict, Qianjin Subdistrict, Donghu Subdistrict, Wusan Subdistrict, East Hunhe Station Subdistrict, West Hunhe Station Subdistrict

Towns:
Taoxian, Gaokan, Zhujiatun, Shenjingzi, Lixiang, Baita

Townships:
Wangbingou Township, Mantang Manchu Ethnic Township

Hunnan New Area
Hunnan New Area was envisaged in 1988 as one of the National High And New Technology Industry Development Zones in the first batch by the State Council in 1991. Construction began in 1991 and finished in October 2001.

The park also includes the following development areas:
Shenyang High-tech Industrial Development Zone
Shenyang Export Processing Zone
Shenyang Singapore Industrial Park

Since 2010, Hunnan New Area has been under the same administration as Dongling District, which was renamed Hunnan District in July 2014.

Education

Shenyang Transformation International School has its campus in the district.

References

External links

Shenyang
County-level divisions of Liaoning